Rose of Cimarron is a 1952 American Western film produced by Edward L. Alperson for 20th Century Fox. Despite the title, it has nothing to do with Rose Dunn the actual "Rose of Cimarron". The film is a revenge Western with a twist: the protagonist is a woman raised by the Cherokee avenging her parents who were murdered by whites.

Plot
When a covered wagon heading for California is attacked by Comanche, the only survivor is a baby girl. A young Cherokee brave finds her and brings her to his parents where she is raised as a Cherokee but with intimate knowledge of the language and customs of white Americans. She is named Rose of Cimarron after a mountain lion.

Rose's pleasant life ends when a sheriff's posse arrives at her adopted parents' ranch. They are searching for three bank robbers and ask Lone Eagle's advice of which route would take the bank robbers out of the badlands. Rose and her brother Willie know the area due to their trapping and guide the sheriff and his men there. As soon as they leave the three bank robbers come out of hiding and demand Lone Eagle and his wife sell or trade fresh horses to them. When they refuse they murder the both of them.

Rose straps on a pair of six guns and a knife to avenge her parents. Though she has not witnessed the murders she can identify the horses the killers have stolen, a skewbald, a palomino and a sorrel. Arriving in town Rose demands the town marshal apprehend and hang the murderers. The marshal offers to perform his duty within the law but advises Rose that sometimes even the law can fail. Rose promises that if the law fails, she won't.

Rose acquires a room in a boarding house without realising the man who offers it to her, George Newcombe, is one of the murderers. With the law taking its time Rose identifies two of the murderers by their mounts. When she questions them the two move away but she draws her six-guns and shoots them dead. Despite the plea of self-defence, Rose is locked up where she meets Deacon, an elderly criminal with a plan for a bullion robbery. George and his new accomplices free Deacon and Rose from jail. On the trail escaping from the law, Rose and George gradually discover each is out to kill the other.

Cast

 Mala Powers as Rose of Cimarron
 Jack Buetel as Marshal Hollister
 Bill Williams as George Newcomb
 Jim Davis as Willie Whitewater
 Dick Curtis as Clem Dawley
 Lane Bradford as Mike Finch
 William Phipps as Jeb Dawley
 Bob Steele as Rio
 Alex Gerry as Judge Kirby
 Lillian Bronson  as Emmy Anders
 Art Smith as Deacon
 Monte Blue as Lone Eagle
 Argentina Brunetti as Red Fawn
 Irving Bacon as Sheriff
 Tom Monroe as Townsman
 George Chandler as Deputy Sheriff
 John Doucette as Henchman
 Tommy Cook as Willie, as a Boy
 William Schallert as Gold Bullion Guard
 Wade Crosby as Henchman
 Kenneth MacDonald as Posse Sheriff
 Byron Foulger as Townsman

Production
Both Mala Powers and Jack Buetel were borrowed from Howard Hughes who had both under a personal contract. Outdoor scenes were filmed in Topanga Canyon.

Though she had only ever ridden ponies and fired cap pistols, Powers was convincingly trained for several weeks in riding at the Ace Hudkins stables and in fast draws and weapons use by ace stuntmen Tom Steele and David Sharpe. The only scene she was doubled in was when stuntwoman Polly Burson climbed from a galloping horse onto a moving train.

Quotes
All they have for us is a quick trial, a brief verdict and a short rope - Deacon

References

External links
 
 
 
 

1952 films
20th Century Fox films
1952 Western (genre) films
Cinecolor films
Films directed by Harry Keller
Films adapted into comics
Films scored by Raoul Kraushaar
American Western (genre) films
1950s English-language films
1950s American films